Andrew Gould may refer to:

 Andrew Gould (businessman) (born 1946), British businessman
 Andrew Gould (judge) (born 1963), American judge